Pedro Martínez de la Rosa (born 24 February 1971) is a Spanish former Formula One driver who has participated in 107 Grands Prix for the Arrows, Jaguar, McLaren, Sauber and HRT teams. He made his Formula One debut on 7 March 1999, becoming one of seventy-six drivers to score a point in his first race. He has scored a total of 35 championship points, which includes a podium finish at the 2006 Hungarian Grand Prix. He is currently a brand ambassador for the Aston Martin Formula 1 Team.

Early career
De la Rosa was born in Barcelona, Catalonia, Spain, and unlike most drivers, he started his career in radio-controlled cars, specialising in 1:8 off-road. He won three consecutive domestic championship titles between 1983 and 1985, he became the first multiple European radio controlled off-road championship twice in 1983 and 1984 and was runner up in the inaugural world championship in 1986. It was only after that when he started karting in a local Spanish championship in 1988 when he was 17. He then joined the Spanish Formula Fiat Uno and became champion in 1989.

Professional career
In 1990, De la Rosa raced in Spanish Formula Ford 1600 and became champion. He later drove in British Formula Ford 1600 and got two podiums out of six races. In 1991, De la Rosa achieved fourth place in the Spanish Formula Renault Championship with three podium finishes. In 1992 he was both European and British Formula Renault champion. He slipped down the order in the next two years. In 1995, he was champion of the Japanese Formula Three series and third in the Macau Grand Prix. In 1996, he finished 8th in both the Formula Nippon and All Japan GT Championship. The next year he was champion in Formula Nippon. He was also the All Japan GT Champion with Michael Krumm.

Formula One (1999–2014)

Arrows (1999–2000)

In , De la Rosa was a test driver for Jordan. He regularly out-paced his more experienced teammate Toranosuke Takagi. In 2000 he remained at Arrows alongside Dutchman Jos Verstappen. He scored two points, finishing sixth in the German Grand Prix and the European Grand Prix. Verstappen commented mid-season that he and De la Rosa 'work well together and we have a good partnership'. During the 2000 season, the Arrows team took part in a 13-part TV series named 'Racing Arrows' which followed the team and drivers throughout the year. It was shown on British TV channel ITV in 2001.

Jaguar (2001–2002)
He raced for two years with Jaguar Racing alongside Eddie Irvine, scoring 3 points in 2001 and none in 2002. At the end of the 2002 season Jaguar paid off his contract which was set to expire at the conclusion of 2003, replacing him with Antônio Pizzonia.

McLaren (2003–2009)

He became a test driver for McLaren but raced at the 2005 Bahrain Grand Prix when Juan Pablo Montoya injured his shoulder. He finished fifth and set a lap record which he still holds .

On 11 July 2006 it was announced that De la Rosa would take over the second McLaren race seat with immediate effect following Juan Pablo Montoya's departure to NASCAR. It was initially unclear whether he would remain in the seat until the end of the season, but some successful results led to him being retained.

At the 2006 Hungarian Grand Prix De la Rosa scored his first and only Formula One podium, finishing in second place behind Jenson Button.

De la Rosa would carry on as the team's test driver.

For the  season he combined his testing duties with providing race commentary for Spanish broadcaster Telecinco. After his absence in 2006 he returned to the microphone in 2007.

Reports in 2007 consistently linked De la Rosa to a return to F1 racing with the new Prodrive team, which was set to make its debut in the  season. Speculation suggested that Prodrive would run with support from the McLaren team, and that De la Rosa, along with fellow tester Gary Paffett, would race for them in their maiden season.  However, the team failed to make the grid for the new season, and De la Rosa instead remained as a test driver for McLaren.

De la Rosa was also involved in the espionage controversy surrounding his team and rivals Ferrari.  With evidence provided by him and teammate Fernando Alonso, the FIA excluded the team from the 2007 Constructors' Championship, and issued a record fine of $100 million.  He was understood to have sent e-mails to Mike Coughlan and Fernando Alonso regarding the Ferrari cars' setup.

Before the Australian Grand Prix of 2008, De la Rosa was elected as the new chairman of the Grand Prix Drivers' Association after a unanimous vote. De la Rosa was the preferred candidate for GPDA directors Mark Webber and Fernando Alonso.  He replaced the retired Ralf Schumacher in the role. He remained at McLaren in 2009, and as of January 2010 was the fifth most experienced test driver in history, in terms of test days. He stated that he wished to step down from the role of GPDA chairman, following the completion of his deal to drive for Sauber in 2010, and was duly replaced in the role by Nick Heidfeld at the Australian Grand Prix.

Sauber (2010–2011)

In 2010 De la Rosa drove for the newly resurrected Sauber team. His teammate at Sauber was Japanese driver Kamui Kobayashi who impressed at Toyota during the last two races of the 2009 Formula One season.

These points would be the last of his Formula One career. De la Rosa qualified in the top ten on two occasions, at Silverstone and in Hungary as both he and teammate Kobayashi struggled with reliability problems for the majority of the season.

He was dropped from his race seat by Sauber in favour of Nick Heidfeld after the Italian Grand Prix. De la Rosa replaced Heidfeld as test driver for Pirelli, in anticipation for their return to Formula One for the  season.

De la Rosa managed to stay out of trouble throughout the first part of the race, affected by heavy rain, running as high as ninth before a red flag suspended the race. He eventually finished 12th after having some contact soon after the restart which required a new wing.

McLaren (2011)
On 9 March 2011, McLaren announced that De la Rosa had returned to the team as their test and reserve driver.

HRT (2012) 

On 21 November 2011, it was announced that De la Rosa had signed for HRT F1 on a two-year contract. His teammate was Indian driver Narain Karthikeyan. Both drivers failed to qualify for the first race of the season in Australia, as De la Rosa was only able to complete seven timed laps during the race weekend. At the next race weekend in Malaysia, he was able to qualify and finish 22nd in the race after receiving a drive through penalty after the race was restarted, and he was later promoted to 21st place due to Karthikeyan's 20-second penalty for an incident with Sebastian Vettel.

De la Rosa qualified ahead of Karthikeyan once again in China, and finished 21st, one lap down from the race winner. In Bahrain, he finished 20th after qualifying 22nd, although after the race he admitted that the team still needed "to gain some speed per lap" to fight their rivals on a consistent basis. Following on from this, De la Rosa finished his home race for the first time since 1999 in 19th place, the last of all classified drivers. However, he was unable to complete the Monaco Grand Prix due to a collision with Pastor Maldonado at the beginning of the race.

De la Rosa had a contract to compete in the 2013 season with HRT and was due to become team principal for 2014. The team folded at the end of the 2012 season, meaning de la Rosa was unable to take either position.

Ferrari (2013–2014) 
On 16 January, Ferrari announced that De la Rosa had been signed in a developmental role for the team, aiding with its simulator resources.
On 24 January Ferrari announced that De la Rosa would share testing duties of their 2013 challenger, the F138, with Felipe Massa at the first test of the season, beginning on 5 February in Jerez.

After Formula 1 (2015–) 
De la Rosa is now the technical and sporting advisor to the Techeetah Formula E team. De la Rosa also runs a driving school and racing team called Drivex.

He has also worked as color analyst for Formula One broadcasts on La Sexta, Telecinco, Movistar and currently DAZN.

Aston Martin ambassador (2022–) 
In October 2022, De la Rosa was appointed ambassador for Aston Martin Formula One Team.

Personal life 
De la Rosa has one daughter.

Racing record

Career summary

Complete RC racing results 
(Races in bold indicate top qualifier)

IFMAR World Championship results

EFRA European Championship results

AECAR Campeonato de España results

Complete Formula Nippon results
(key) (Races in bold indicate pole position; races in italics indicate fastest lap)

Complete JGTC results
(key) (Races in bold indicate pole position) (Races in italics indicate fastest lap)

Complete Formula One results
(key)

References

External links

 
 

1971 births
Living people
Formula Ford drivers
British Formula Renault 2.0 drivers
British Formula Three Championship drivers
Japanese Formula 3 Championship drivers
Formula Nippon drivers
Spanish Formula One drivers
Catalan Formula One drivers
Arrows Formula One drivers
Jaguar Formula One drivers
McLaren Formula One drivers
Sauber Formula One drivers
HRT Formula One drivers
Paul Stewart Racing drivers
TOM'S drivers